The Galway Intermediate Hurling Championship (known for sponsorship reasons as the Galmont Hotel Intermediate Hurling Championship and abbreviated to the Galway IHC) is an annual hurling competition organised by the Galway County Board of the Gaelic Athletic Association and contested by the top-ranking intermediate clubs in the county of Galway in Ireland. It is the second tier overall in the entire Galway hurling championship system.

The Galway Intermediate Championship was introduced in 1949 as a competition that would bridge the gap between the senior grade and the junior grade.

In its current format, the Galway Intermediate Championship begins in April. The 14 participating teams are drawn into two groups of seven teams and play each other in a round-robin system. The four top-ranking teams in both groups proceed to the knockout phase that culminates with the final match at Kenny Park in October. The winner of the Galway Intermediate Championship, as well as being presented with the Mick Sylver Cup, qualifies for the subsequent Connacht Club Championship.

The competition has been won by 37 teams, 19 of which have won it more than once. Mullagh, Pádraig Pearses and Killimordaly are the most successful teams in the tournament's history, having won it 4 times each. Killimor are the reigning champions, having beaten Meelick-Eyrecourt by 0-13 to 0-09 in the 2022 final in Duggan Park Ballinasloe on October 15th 2022.

Qualification for subsequent competitions

Connacht Intermediate Club Hurling Championship
The Galway IHC winners qualify for the Connacht Intermediate Club Hurling Championship. It is the only team from County Galway to qualify for this competition. The Galway IHC winners enter the Connacht Intermediate Club Hurling Championship at the __ stage. For example, 2018 winner Oranmore-Maree won the Connacht IHC, as did 2016 winner Ahascragh-Fohenagh, and 2015 winner Abbeyknockmoy 2014 winner Cappataggle also won, becoming the ninth Galway IHC club to do so.

All-Ireland Intermediate Club Hurling Championship
The Galway IHC winners — by winning the Connacht Intermediate Club Hurling Championship — may qualify for the All-Ireland Intermediate Club Hurling Championship, at which they would enter at the __ stage. For example, 2018 Galway IHC winner Oranmore-Maree (featuring Galway All-Ireland Senior Hurling Championship winners Gearóid McInerney (All Star) and Niall Burke) won the All-Ireland Championship title at Croke Park.

Roll of honour

List of finals

References

External links
Official Galway Website
Galway on Hoganstand
Galway Club GAA

 
1
Intermediate hurling county championships